Nzega is a town in central Tanzania. It is the district headquarter of Nzega District.

Transport
Paved Trunk roads T3 from Morogoro to the Rwanda border and T8 from Tabora to Mwanza meet in Nzega town.

Population
According to the 2012 national census the population of Nzega town (Nzega Mjini Ward) is 34,744.

References

Populated places in Tabora Region